Roboastra gracilis is a species  of sea slug, a polycerid nudibranch, a marine gastropod mollusc in the family Polyceridae.

Distribution
This sea slug is found in the tropical western Pacific Ocean.

Description
Robastra gracilis is a relatively small nudibranch reaching only 20–25 mm (2-2.5 cm) in length.

References

External links 

 http://www.seaslugforum.net/robograc.htm
 http://www.museum.wa.gov.au/dampier/species_view.asp?speciesID=1708
 

Polyceridae
Gastropods described in 1877